Cilevirus is a genus of viruses in the family Kitaviridae. Plants serve as natural hosts. There are two species: Citrus leprosis virus C and Citrus leprosis virus C2.

History
This genus was created in 2006 by Locali-Fabris et al in 2006.

Structure
Viruses in Cilevirus are non-enveloped, with bacilliform geometries. These viruses are about 50 nm wide and 150 nm long. Genomes are linear and segmented, bipartite, around 28.75kb in length. The genome is bipartite with two segments of 8745 nucleotide (RNA 1) and 4986 nucleotides (RNA 2) in length. The 5' terminals of both segments have a cap structure and have poly adenosine tails in their 3'-terminals. RNA 1 contains two open reading frames (ORFs) which encode 286 and 29 kiloDalton (kDa) proteins. The 286 kDa protein is a polyprotein involved in virus replication and has four conserved domains: methyltransferase, protease, helicase and an RNA dependent RNA polymerase. RNA 2 encodes four ORFs which correspond to 15, 61, 32 and 24 kDa proteins. The 32 kDa protein is involved in cell to cell movement of the virus but the functions of the other proteins are unknown.

Life cycle
Viral replication is cytoplasmic. Entry into the host cell is achieved by penetration into the host cell. Replication follows the positive stranded RNA virus replication model. Positive stranded rna virus transcription is the method of transcription. The virus exits the host cell by tubule-guided viral movement.
Plants serve as the natural host. The virus is transmitted via a vector (mites of the genus brevipalpus). Transmission routes are vector.

Clinical
This virus causes Citrus leprosis disease and is transmitted by species of the mite genus Brevipalpus (Acari: Tenuipalpidae). This disease is endemic in Brazil and has recently spread to Central America. Its spread there represents a threat to citrus industry in the United States.

References

External links
 Viralzone: Cilevirus
 ICTV

Positive-sense single-stranded RNA viruses
Riboviria
Virus genera